Mesalges is a genus of mites belonging to the family Psoroptoididae.

Species:
 Mesalges diaphanoxus
 Mesalges lyrurus
 Mesalges oscinum

References 

Acari